Costa Rica and its two OTI member stations Teletica and Repretel debuted in the OTI Festival in 1976 in Acapulco, one year later than most of its Central American neighbours. The first Costa Rican entrant in the song contest was Felix Ángel with a patriotic song called "Patria" (Homeland) which didn't receive a warm reception by the juries and placed 13th, scoring only two points. Since their debut, this country took part in every edition of the event until the last edition, which was held again in Acapulco.

Costa Rica hosted the OTI Contest in 1998 and the venue was the National Theatre of San José. The stage was dark colored with a blue floor. The orchestra zone was in the background.

History 
Costa Rica never managed to win the festival but the country enjoyed some successes. In 1980, in Buenos Aires, the singer Ricardo Padilla achieved fourth place, with the song "El amor se va" (Love goes away) scoring 29 points. Two years later in Lima, the capital of Peru, the same singer returned to the event, again placing fourth with the song "La mujer de mi vida" (The woman of my life).

One of the biggest Costa Rican successes came in 1986, in Santiago with Cristina Gutiérrez and her song "Bendito seas, varón" (Be blessed, man) which placed third.

Eleven years earlier, in Lima, in 1977, the singer Erick León recorded Costa Rica's highest place ever, placing second with his song "La hora cero" (The zero hour) which was warmly welcomed by the juries.

Contestants

References 

OTI Festival
Costa Rican music